VGZ files are compressed video files that use Chateau Technical's propriety H.264 codec. They are usually found in security camera DVRs.

There is an embedded timestamp that is security coded. The VG player software allows you to convert to AVI format, but you lose the overlaid timestamp when you do this.

VG Player 
VG Player for Win2000/XP is a player used to play back video recorded by the DigitalVDO recorder. The video files are compressed using Super Motion Image Compression Technology (SMICT).

The VG Player can be used to play back video, enhance the video quality, make video clips and take snapshots.

The VG Player also has an image format converter tool to convert the SMICT format to AVI format.   
Be careful as compression ratio is very high – 1 Mb .vgz may be over 400 Mb uncompressed.

Converting vgz files to AVI is rather pointless if you are hoping to collect video as evidence. The time code on the original video is security protected and will deliberately not appear on converted video. Otherwise converted AVI could be opened in a video editor where all sorts of tricks could be performed. The original vgz file is needed for evidence.

External links 
 Some good technical info here

Rebadged versions of player software 
 Ionit USA (the sole master distributor of Chateau products in North America

Video compression